Czerce  (Cherche) is a village in the administrative district of Gmina Sieniawa, within Przeworsk County, Subcarpathian Voivodeship, in south-eastern Poland.

The village has a population of 443.

References

Czerce